The 1999 Toyota Atlantic Championship season was contested over 12 rounds. The KOOL Toyota Atlantic Championship Drivers' Champion was Anthony Lazzaro driving for PPI Motorsports. 19 different teams and 44 different drivers competed. In this one-make formula all drivers had to utilize Swift chassis and Toyota engines. This season also saw a C2-class running older Ralt chassis and Toyota engines. In C2-class seven different drivers competed, but none of them for the whole season.

Calendar

Final points standings

Driver

Main championship

For every race the points were awarded: 20 points to the winner, 16 for runner-up, 14 for third place, 12 for fourth place, 10 for fifth place, 8 for sixth place, 6 seventh place, winding down to 1 point for 12th place. Lower placed drivers did not award points. Additional points were awarded to the pole winner (1 point) and to the driver leading the most laps (1 point). C2-class drivers were not able to score points in the main class.

Note:

Race 8 Nicolas Rondet had 2 points deduction due to taking unjustifiable risk.

C2-Class championship

Points system see above. But additional points only awarded for the fastest qualifier. No additional point awarded to the driver leading the most laps.

Note:

No more competitors in C2-class. Four races without a single entry.

Complete overview

R22=retired, but classified NS=did not start

See also
1999 CART season
1999 Indy Lights season
1999 Indy Racing League season

External links
ChampCarStats.com

Atlantic
Atlantic Season, 1999
Atlantic Championship seasons
Atlantic